Equatorial Guinea participated at the 2018 Summer Youth Olympics in Buenos Aires, Argentina from 6 October to 18 October 2018.

Athletics (track and field)

Track & road events

Swimming

Boys

Girls

References

Youth
Nations at the 2018 Summer Youth Olympics
Equatorial Guinea at the Youth Olympics